Richard Weiss (1963–1997) was a German-American kayaker.

Richard Weiss or Weiß may also refer to:

Richard Weiss (wrestler) (born 1973), Australian Olympic wrestler
Richard Weiss (musician) on I Can't Help It
Dick Weiss (born 1946), American glass artist
Rick Weiss, voice artist of videogame Shadow of Rome
Richard Weiß, former Rollei engineer and chief of development